Riders of the Range may refer to:

 Riders of the Range, a 1923 silent Western film
 Riders of the Range, a 1949 Western film
 Riders of the Range (radio serial), a 1949–1953 BBC radio serial